Below is an incomplete list of fictional feature films, short films or miniseries that have been filmed in locations of the Costa Brava.

External links
 Costa Brava Girona Tourism Board Official Website
 Costa Brava 100 years
 A City of Movies

 
Costa Brava
Costa Brava films